Pamela Austin (born March 12, 1950) is an American former professional tennis player.

College career
Austin played college tennis at UCLA and won a Pacific-8 Conference doubles championship while she was there.

Grand Slam singles tournament timeline

World Team Tennis
Austin, along with her brother Jeff, was a member of the 1974 World Team Tennis champion Denver Racquets.

Family life
Austin's younger sister Tracy was a two-time US Open champion. In addition to her brother Jeff, Austin's brothers Doug and John were also professional tennis players. She is the sister-in-law of fitness instructor and author Denise Austin, who is married to Jeff.

See also

List of female tennis players

References

1950 births
Living people
UCLA Bruins women's tennis players
American female tennis players
Sportspeople from Los Angeles County, California
People from Rolling Hills, California
Tennis people from California